The 2007 Women's World Floorball Championships were the sixth world championships in women's floorball. The tournament took place over May 12 to 19, 2007 in Frederikshavn, Denmark. Sweden won the tournament defeating Finland, 7-3, in the final-game.

All matches took place in the FRH Arena Nord.

Championship results

Preliminary round

Group A

May 12, 2007

May 13, 2007

May 14, 2007

May 15, 2007

May 16, 2007

Group B

May 12, 2007

May 13, 2007

May 14, 2007

May 15, 2007

May 16, 2007

Playoffs

Semi-finals

Bronze Medal match

World Championship match

Placement round

9th Place match

7th Place match

5th Place match

Leading scorers

All-Star team
Goalkeeper:  Jonna Mäkelä
Defense:     Simone Berner,  Jenni Morottaja
Forward:     Karolina Widar,  Camilla Nilsson,  Mirca Anderegg

Rankings

Official 2007 Rankings according to the IFF

References

External links
 Official Standings (IFF)

2007, Women's
Floorball
Women's World Floorball Championships, 2007
Floorball in Denmark
International sports competitions hosted by Denmark
May 2007 sports events in Europe
Sport in Frederikshavn